Anna Wendzikowska (born 7 September 1981) is a Polish actress, journalist and television presenter. She is a correspondent of Dzień Dobry TVN.

Career
She is a graduate of the Stefan Batory Gymnasium and Lyceum. She studied at the Private Acting School of Halina and Jan Machulski in Warsaw, in the Krakow studio Lart. She also began journalism studies at the University of Warsaw, but ended them in London, where she left in 2005.

In 2007, she appeared in the music video for the song "Kill The Pain" by Poise Rite. She performs in the television series M jak miłość, where she plays the role of Monika.

From September to October 2011, she participated in the thirteenth edition of the programme Dancing with the Stars: Taniec z gwiazdami on TVN. Her dance partner was Michał Stukan, with whom she took tenth place.

Private life
In January 2015, she gave birth to her daughter, Kornelia. The child's father is Patryk Ignaczak.

Filmography
2001–02: Lokatorzy as Wioletta Puszczyk, Marlena
2002: Nienasycenie as Eliza
2003: Show as Monika
2004: Dziki as Kasia
2004: Oficer as prostitute (Episode 5, not credited)
2004: Out of Reach as Soraya
2004, 2007: Kryminalni as hostess, Monika
2005: Pierwsza miłość as receptionist (Episode 60)
2005: Klinika samotnych serc as Kaja
2006: Serce na dłoni as Ania
2006: Cold Kenya as szatniarka
2008: The Final Wait as woman
2008: The Bill as Halina Lesnik
2008: Coming Up as mother
2008–09: Klan as Kaja
2009: Londyńczycy as hostess
2010: Edge as Agata
2010: Casualty as Vita
From 2011: M jak miłość as Monika
2014: Paranoia (short film) as sister
2015: Bangistan as border guard at the airport
2016: True Crimes as interview journalist

References

External links

Anna Wendzikowska on Filmweb 
Anna Wendzikowska on filmpolski.pl 

Polish journalists
Polish women journalists
Polish women television presenters
Polish film actresses
1981 births
Actresses from Warsaw
Living people